The Sabah Native Co-operation Party (abbreviated ANAK NEGERI) is a political party in Malaysia focussing on Sabah.

Following its recognition by the Registry of Societies (RoS) in 2017, the party contested in the 2018 Malaysian general election. The party also sign political pact with Love Sabah Party (PCS) with the ultimate goal to restore the rights, dignity and identity of the ‘Anak Negeri’ (native) or the firstborn in the state of Sabah.

State election results

See also 
 Politics of Malaysia
 List of political parties in Malaysia

References 

Political parties in Sabah
Political parties established in 2013
2013 establishments in Malaysia